Eddy M. Zemach (1935 – 21 May 2021) was an Israeli philosopher, born in Jerusalem, Mandatory Palestine.

He was Ahad Ha'am Professor Emeritus in the Department of Philosophy at the Hebrew University of Jerusalem. He received his Ph.D. from Yale University in 1965. His main research interests were  aesthetics, metaphysics, epistemology, philosophy of psychology, and philosophy of language.

Major works
 1970: Analytic Aesthetics, Daga (in Hebrew).
 1976: Aesthetics, Institute for Poetics & Semiotics (in Hebrew).
 1992: The Reality of Meaning and the Meaning of 'Reality''', Brown U. Press.
 1992: Types: Essays in Metaphysics, E. J. Brill Publishers.
 1997: Real Beauty, Penn State Press....
 2001: Mind and Right'', Magnes Press (in Hebrew).

References

External links
 Recent article in "Iton Tel-Aviv" (in Hebrew)
 Works by Eddy Zemach, PhilPapers
 Recent translation of two papers about Ontology by Matthieu Dubost for Klesis (in french)

1935 births
2021 deaths
21st-century Israeli philosophers
Analytic philosophers
Epistemologists
Academic staff of the Hebrew University of Jerusalem
Israeli philosophers
Metaphysicians
Philosophers of art
Philosophers of language
Philosophers of psychology
Yale University alumni
People from Jerusalem